Relatively Speaking is an anthology produced on Broadway in 2011, consisting of three plays: Talking Cure by Ethan Coen, George Is Dead by Elaine May and Honeymoon Motel by Woody Allen.

Production
It opened at the Brooks Atkinson Theatre on October 20, 2011 and closed on January 29, 2012, after 118 regular performances. All three were directed by John Turturro. The plays were produced by 
Julian Schlossberg and Letty Aronson (Allen’s sister).

Cast
The three plays were cast as follows:

Talking Cure: Jason Kravits (Doctor), Danny Hoch (Jerry), Max Gordon Moore (Attendant), Allen Lewis Rickman (Father) and Katherine Borowitz (Mother). The play involves a therapist treating a mentally ill family member.
George Is Dead: Lisa Emery (Carla), Marlo Thomas (Doreen), Grant Shaud (Michael), Patricia O’Connell (Nanny), Rickman (Funeral Director) and Moore (Assistant Funeral Director). The play considers "the hilarity of death."
Honeymoon Motel: Steve Guttenberg (Jerry Spector), Ari Graynor (Nina Roth), Shaud (Eddie), Caroline Aaron (Judy Spector), Julie Kavner (Fay Roth), Mark Linn-Baker (Sam Roth), Richard Libertini (Rabbi Baumel), Jason Kravits (Dr. Brill), Hoch (Sal Buonacotti) and Bill Army (Paul Jessup). The plot involves an unusual wedding and takes place in a motel on a highway.

Overview
Woody Allen said of the plays: “It’s a broad comedy, for laughs, no redeeming social value." The plays are described as involving various family members.

Santo Loquasto "designed sets for each play that suggest each author’s film persona." The design for the Allen play is a "colorful, comical design for the motel, with its circular bed and pink Jacuzzi."

References

External links
 

2011 plays
Plays by Woody Allen
Plays by Elaine May
Plays by Ethan Coen